The Church of Jesus Christ of Latter-day Saints in Angola refers to the Church of Jesus Christ of Latter-day Saints and its members in Angola. The first branch (small congregation) was organized in 1996 with fewer than 100 members. As of 2019, there were 4,160 members in 18 congregations.

History

A brief history can be found at LDS Newsroom (Angola) or Deseret News 2010 Church Almanac (Country Information: Angola)

Stake and Congregations

As of February 2023, Angola had the following congregations:

Luanda Angola Stake
Benfica Ward
Cacuaco Branch
Cassequel Branch
Cazenga Branch
Golf Ward
Kilamba Ward
Nova Vida Ward
Patriota Ward
Prenda Branch
Terra Nova Ward
Viana Ward
Zango Ward

Huambo Angola District
Bom Pastor Branch
Cidade Alta Branch
Sao Joao Branch

Other Congregations
Congregations in Angola not part of a stake or district include
Mapunda Branch	(Lubango)
Tchioco Branch (Lubango)
Menongue Branch (Menongue)
Angola Luanda Mission Branch (Countrywide)

The Angola Luanda Mission Branch serves Families and individuals not in proximity of a meetinghouse.  Congregations not part of a stake are called branches, regardless of size.

Missions
The Luanda Angola Mission was created on July 1, 2013

Temples
Angola was located in the Kinshasa Democratic Republic of the Congo Temple District as of February 2023.

See also

 Religion in Angola
 Christianity in Angola

References

External links
 Newsroom (Angola)
 The Church of Jesus Christ of Latter-day Saints Official site
 ComeUntoChrist.org Latter-day Saints Visitor site

Christian denominations in Angola
The Church of Jesus Christ of Latter-day Saints in Africa